Querejeta is a surname. Notable people with the surname include:

Elías Querejeta (born 1934), Spanish film producer
Gracia Querejeta (born 1962), Spanish film director
Jorge Querejeta (born 1968), former field hockey player from Argentina
José Antonio Querejeta (born 1957), former basketball player for Spain